Ovalo is an unincorporated community in Taylor County, Texas, United States. Ovalo has a post office with the ZIP code 79541.

The community is part of the Abilene, Texas Metropolitan Statistical Area.

Climate
The climate in this area is characterized by hot, humid summers and generally mild to cool winters.  According to the Köppen climate classification system, Ovalo has a humid subtropical climate, Cfa on climate maps.

References

Unincorporated communities in Taylor County, Texas
Unincorporated communities in Texas
Abilene metropolitan area